The 33rd Golden Melody Awards (Chinese: 第33屆金曲獎) took place in Kaohsiung Arena, Kaohsiung, Taiwan in 2022, which marked its return at Kaohsiung City since the 16th edition. The award ceremony for the popular music categories was hosted by Daniel Lo and broadcast on TTV on 2 July 2022. 

Tanya Chua received the most nominations with eight and won three major awards for Best Female Mandarin Singer, Best Mandarin Album and Album of the Year. She is the first singer to ever win Best Mandarin Album and Album of the Year at the same time, after the award was reintroduced in the 28th Golden Melody Awards. Chua is now the holder of "Most Wins for a Performer" in the Best Female Mandarin Singer category.

Winners and nominees

Notes

References 

Golden
Golden
Golden Melody Awards
Golden